Harabdeh (also Romanized as Ḩarabdeh) is a village in Harazpey-ye Gharbi Rural District, in the Central District of Mahmudabad County, Mazandaran Province, Iran. At the 2006 census, its population was 618, in 138 families.

References 

Populated places in Mahmudabad County